Luis Enrique Vera Martineau (born March 9, 1973 in Ciudad Bolívar) is a retired Venezuelan football (soccer) midfielder for Caracas FC and Venezuela. He is nicknamed "El Pájaro".

Club career
Vera has played club football for Minervén, Zulia, Caracas FC and Monagas.

International career
He has played over 50 times for Venezuela national team and was a participant at the 2007 Copa America.

International goals

|-
| 1. || March 7, 2004 || José Pachencho Romero, Maracaibo, Venezuela ||  || 1–0 || 2-1 || Friendly
|}

External links

International career statistics at rsssf

1973 births
Living people
People from Ciudad Bolívar
Venezuelan footballers
Venezuela international footballers
2001 Copa América players
2007 Copa América players
Minervén S.C. players
Zulia F.C. players
Caracas FC players
Monagas S.C. players
Real Esppor Club players
Association football midfielders
Mineros de Guayana managers
Zamora F.C. managers
Angostura F.C. managers